Classic Masters is a Sammy Hagar compilation album in the Classic Masters series. The track listing is identical to The Best of Sammy Hagar (1992) albeit with 24-bit digital remastering.

Track listing
"Red" (John Carter/Sammy Hagar) - 4:57
"(Sittin' On) The Dock of the Bay" (Steve Cropper/Otis Redding) - 3:02
"I've Done Everything for You" (Sammy Hagar) - 3:25
"Rock 'N' Roll Weekend" (Sammy Hagar) - 3:43
"Cruisin' & Boozin'" (Sammy Hagar) - 3:07
"Turn Up the Music" (John Carter/Sammy Hagar) - 5:46
"Reckless" (Sammy Hagar) - 3:34
"Trans Am (Highway Wonderland)" (Sammy Hagar) - 3:31
"Love or Money" (Sammy Hagar) - 3:57
"This Planet's on Fire (Burn in Hell)" (Sammy Hagar) - 4:36
"Plain Jane" (Sammy Hagar) - 3:48
"Bad Reputation" (Sammy Hagar) - 3:32
"Bad Motor Scooter" (Sammy Hagar) - 7:07
"You Make Me Crazy" (Sammy Hagar) - 2:45

External links
 www.redrockerdiscography.com

2002 compilation albums
Sammy Hagar albums